Dooke is a surname, and may refer to:

 Richard Dooke, English 16th-century Vice-Chancellor of Oxford University

See also 
 Doke

References